Soto de Luiña is one of nine parishes (administrative divisions) in the Cudillero municipality, within the province and autonomous community of Asturias, in northern Spain.

The population is 505 (INE 2007).

Villages
 Albuerne
 Llanurrozu
 Pandiellu
 Prámaru
 San Pedru la Ribera
 Troncéu
 Valdréu

References

Parishes in Cudillero

Church Santa María